McPherson Township may refer to the following townships in the United States:

 McPherson Township, McPherson County, Kansas
 McPherson Township, Sherman County, Kansas
 McPherson Township, Blue Earth County, Minnesota